Daphne G. Jennings (born 26 January 1939 in North Vancouver, British Columbia) was a Canadian teacher and member of the House of Commons of Canada from 1993 to 1997.

She was elected as a Reform party candidate at the Mission—Coquitlam electoral district in the 1993 federal election. After serving in the 35th Canadian Parliament, Jennings did not seek a second term in Parliament and left federal politics after the 1997 election.

External links
 

1939 births
Living people
Reform Party of Canada MPs
Members of the House of Commons of Canada from British Columbia
Women members of the House of Commons of Canada
Women in British Columbia politics